Jill Sigman is a choreographer, dancer, teacher and company director from Brooklyn. She received her PhD in Philosophy from Princeton University in 1998, as well as formed her company . Sigman is known for her audience participation and use of installations in her performance pieces.

Background
Sigman was born in Brooklyn and trained in classical ballet at both the Joffrey Ballet and the Ballet Center of Brooklyn. She began training in modern while studying for her BA at Princeton University. She is well known for both her solo performances, as well as her larger group pieces choreographed for her company. Sigman's pieces incorporate opinions and actions from the audience that she and her dancers use in the performances. They often perform pieces related to socially relevant topics in alternative spaces.

List of choreographed works
Embers - solo, 1997
 Mother's Tongue/I Love You - duet, 1997 
 Still Life - group, 1997 
 Athena, Goddess of Wisdom - solo, 2000 
 Warbody - , 2002 
 Vision Begins - solo, 2002 
 I Cut the Rug In My Day - , 2003 
 Flood Light - 2003 
 Pulling the Wool: An American Landscape of Truth and Deception - , 2004 
 Paradise and Its Dis-Ease - , 2008 
  ZsaZsaLand - , 2009 
 Our Lady of Detritus - , 2009 
 The Hut Project - , 2009–present 
  Nat. Mur: 5 Rites - , 2010
 Fowl Play: Some Dances About Civilization - solo, 2011 
 (Perma)Culture - , 2014 
 Weed Heart - , 2016

Teaching
Associate Professor, Eugene Lang College The New School for Liberal Arts, 2008
Adjunct Instructor, New York University, 2017 to present

Fellowships and residencies
 Swarthmore Project Residency, Swarthmore College, 2000 
 Kri Foundation Invited Guest Residency, New Delhi, India, 2005 
 Maggie Allesee National Center for Choreography at Florida State University, 2005 
 Movement Research Artist in Residence, 2005 
 EMPAC Residency, 2010 
 Wesleyan University Creative Campus Fellow, 2012 - 2016 
 Green Choreographer Research Residency, 2013 
 Baryshnikov Arts Center Artist Residency, 2013 
 CUNY Dance Initiative Residency, 2016 
 Rauschenberg Residency, 2016 
 NYFA Fellowship in Architecture/Environmental Structures/Design, 2016

References 

American choreographers
American female dancers
21st-century American dancers
People from Brooklyn
Year of birth missing (living people)
Living people
Princeton University alumni
21st-century American women